Fässberg Parish is a parish in the Diocese of Gothenburg in Sweden. It covers most of the town of Mölndal.

See also
 Fässbergs IF

Gothenburg